Swedish Agency for Youth and Civil Society is a Swedish government agency which deals with youth policy and issues relating to Swedish civil society.

The agency distributes between 350 and 600 million SEK annually to about 400 civil society organisations. According to an evaluation by the Swedish Agency for Public Management, about half the organisations receiving funding from MUCF state that they are dependent upon state funding to a great or very great extent and that their economical dependence upon state grants has been increasing since 2014. On average, the recipients state that state funding represents about 60-70% of their income. Of the 150 investigated organisations, 14 stated that their only income is state funding from MUCF. Of the fifty investigated ethnic-community organisations, four stated their only source of income was from MUCF.

Late 2017 announcement of planned relocation to Växjö led to resignation of many employees.

References

External links
 Official website

Government agencies of Sweden